Rock on the Range was an annual rock festival that was held at two locations. The first and main location was in Columbus, Ohio, United States at Mapfre Stadium (originally Columbus Crew Stadium; renamed in 2015) from 2007 to 2018, while the other was in Winnipeg, Manitoba, Canada at the Canad Inns Stadium from 2009 to 2011. Rock on the Range debuted in Columbus on May 19, 2007, and in Winnipeg on June 27, 2009. The Columbus festival was always held in May, while the Winnipeg festival was pushed back to August in 2010. In May 2019, Rock on the Range was officially replaced by the Sonic Temple Art & Music Festival.

Columbus

The first Rock on the Range was held on May 19, 2007, at Columbus Crew Stadium. The sold-out festival ran all day, beginning around noon and ending after 11:00 pm. Due to such success, Rock on the Range was turned into an annual event by returning to Columbus Crew Stadium in 2008. The second festival was a two-day event held on the weekend of May 17–18, 2008. This show had the very first Stone Temple Pilots performance in seven years, ending the band's hiatus. The 2009 show was two days as well, on the weekend of May 16–17, 2009. The lineup was announced on Rock on the Range's official website on Friday, February 13, 2009. For the 2010 festival, each stage has its own sponsor. While the Zippo Music Stage (formerly Jägermeister) is still the same, the "second" stage and the main stage (as they have been previously called) are now referred to as the Bud Light Stage (formerly the Kicker Stage) and the Monster Energy Stage, respectively. Other sponsors host their own events, such as Sony's PlayStation bus that demos new video games. An FYE tent is located near the Kicker Stage where, upon purchase of certain bands' CDs, many meet-and-greets take place.

The festival would often draw more than 30,000 fans each day onto the Columbus Crew Stadium grounds from its inception but in recent years that number has swelled to approximately 40,000 per day. This has occurred mainly due to a rise in the festival's popularity as well as some changes to the festival grounds layout and expansion of the number of festival days.

In 2007 and 2008, two stages were set up: The main stage is inside the stadium at one end of the soccer field, and the second stage is in the parking lot just outside the stadium. For the 2009 show, a third stage was added, the Zippo Music Stage (formerly the Jägermeister stage). It is located outside of the stadium on the opposite side of the second stage. The typical ticket price in the past, and for 2010 as well, is around $50–65 per day, depending on whether attendees choose to have field-access or not. Rock on the Range 2009 was Avenged Sevenfold's last appearance in the United States before their drummer, Jimmy "The Rev" Sullivan died on December 28, 2009. During their performance on May 22, 2010, the music video for Papa Roach's single "Kick in the Teeth" was filmed.

In 2011 and 2012 the festival saw a major change and was expanded to include an additional half-day Friday Night Pre-party that saw the addition of four more bands being added for the party.

In 2013 it was announced that the pre-party day would be made into another full day by adding six more bands to the previous four bands to officially make the festival a three-day event. Also, new to this event year is an updated festival layout and new amenities including a comedy tent and stage, thanks to sponsors Old Milwaukee, Pabst Blue Ribbon and The Funny Bone.

In 2014 it was announced that the third day added in 2013 would be expanded to allow for additional bands to be added to the line-up. The comedy tent and stage added in 2013 would also return. Also, new was an updated festival layout with the addition of carnival rides including a Ferris wheel and a Shock drop.

Estimated attendance each year

2007 – 35,000 (one-day total) sold-out event
2008 – 55,000 (two-day total)
2009 – 55,000 (two-day total)
2010 – 60,000 (two-day total)
2011 – 70,000 (two-and-a-half-day total)
2012 – 70,000 (two-and-a-half-day total)
2013 – 103,000+ (three-day total) sold-out event
2014 – 120,000 (three-day total) sold-out event
2015 – 120,000 (three-day total) sold-out event
2016 – 120,000 (three-day total) sold-out event
2017 – 135,000 (three-day total) sold-out event
2018 – 140,000 (three-day total) sold-out event

2007 lineup
Saturday, May, 19 

Main Stage:
ZZ Top
Evanescence
Velvet Revolver
Hinder
Chevelle
Three Days Grace
Buckcherry
Breaking Benjamin

"Mad Packers" Second Stage:
Papa Roach
Puddle of Mudd
Black Stone Cherry
Operator
2Cents
Whitestarr

2008 lineup

Day one (Saturday, May 17)

Main Stage:
Stone Temple Pilots
Disturbed
Staind
Killswitch Engage
Serj Tankian
Shinedown
Finger Eleven

The ODPS Stage:
Filter
10 Years
Red
Theory of a Deadman
Airbourne
Ashes Divide
Drive A

Day two (Sunday, May 18)

Main Stage:
Kid Rock
3 Doors Down
Papa Roach
Seether
Flyleaf 
Alter Bridge
Five Finger Death Punch

The ODPS Stage:
Sevendust
Drowning Pool
Bobaflex
Black Tide
Rev Theory
Saving Abel

2009 lineup

Day one (Saturday, May 16)

Main stage:
Slipknot
Alice in Chains
Korn
Chevelle
Flyleaf
Saliva
Black Stone Cherry

Second stage:
Atreyu
All That Remains
Rev Theory
Loaded
Crooked X
The Veer Union
Early Pearl

Jägermeister stage:
Static-X
Hurt
Halestorm
X Factor 1
Leo Project

Day two (Sunday, May 17)

Main stage:
Mötley Crüe
Avenged Sevenfold
Buckcherry
Shinedown
Blue October
Saving Abel
Hoobastank

Second stage:
The Used
Billy Talent
Sick Puppies
Pop Evil
Cavo
Framing Hanley
Drive A

Jägermeister stage:
Clutch
Charm City Devils
Adelitas Way
Burn Halo
Royal Bliss

2010 lineup

Day one (Saturday, May 22)

Monster Energy stage:
Godsmack
Three Days Grace
Rise Against
Deftones
Papa Roach
Puddle of Mudd
Drowning Pool
Sevendust

Kicker stage:
Killswitch Engage
Skillet
Halestorm
Adelitas Way
Violent Soho
Richy Nix

Jägermeister stage:
Helmet
Nonpoint
Janus
Taddy Porter
Like a Storm

Day two (Sunday, May 23)

Monster Energy stage:
Limp Bizkit
Rob Zombie
Seether
Slash
Theory of a Deadman
Bullet for My Valentine
Five Finger Death Punch
Apocalyptica

Kicker stage:
Mastodon
Coheed and Cambria
Anberlin
Circa Survive
Airbourne
Shaman's Harvest

Jägermeister stage:
Mushroomhead
Taproot
Year Long Disaster
Noise Auction
State Your Cause

2011 lineup

May 20 pre-party (Friday night)

f.y.e. stage only (all four bands)
 Steel Panther
 Danko Jones
 Lez Zeppelin
 Red Line Chemistry

Day one (Saturday, May 21)

Monster Energy stage:
Avenged Sevenfold
Korn
Staind
Alter Bridge
Hinder
Sick Puppies
Rev Theory
Finger Eleven

f.y.e. stage:
Danzig
Escape the Fate
My Darkest Days
Crossfade
Asking Alexandria
Trust Company

Jägermeister stage:
P.O.D.
Black Veil Brides
2Cents
Egypt Central
Hourcast
Downplay

Day two (Sunday, May 22)

Monster Energy stage:
A Perfect Circle
Disturbed
Puddle of Mudd (replacement for Stone Sour)
Bullet for My Valentine
Black Label Society
All That Remains
Saving Abel
10 Years

f.y.e. stage:
Hollywood Undead
A Day to Remember
Trapt
Cavo
Pop Evil
Greek Fire

Jägermeister stage:
The Damned Things
The Red Jumpsuit Apparatus
Evans Blue
Art of Dying
Red Fang
7th Cycle

2012 lineup

May 18 Pre-party, Friday Night 4Play

f.y.e. stage 
 Hairball
 Foxy Shazam
 Black Tide
 Hells Bells

Day one (Saturday, May 19)

Monster Energy stage:
Incubus
Shinedown
Five Finger Death Punch
Slash featuring Myles Kennedy and The Conspirators
Chevelle
Theory of a Deadman
Halestorm
Adelitas Way

f.y.e. stage:
Cypress Hill
P.O.D.
Cavo
Falling in Reverse
New Medicine
Emphatic

Jägermeister stage:
Bobaflex
In This Moment
Kyng
Rival Sons
Otherwise
Noise Auction

Day two (Sunday, May 20)

Monster Energy stage:
Rob Zombie
Marilyn Manson
Megadeth
Mastodon
Volbeat
The Darkness
Escape the Fate
Black Stone Cherry

f.y.e. stage:
Anthrax
Down
Attack Attack!
Trivium
Redlight King
Aranda

Jägermeister stage:
Lacuna Coil
12 Stones
James Durbin
SOiL
 Eve to Adam
Ghost of August

2013 lineup

Day one (Friday, May 17)

Monster Energy main stage:
Korn
Cheap Trick
Buckcherry
Hollywood Undead
Love and Death

Jägermeister stage:
In Flames
Oleander
Mindset Evolution
American Fangs
XFACTOR1

Day two (Saturday, May 18)

Monster Energy main stage:
The Smashing Pumpkins
Stone Sour
Three Days Grace
Papa Roach
Bullet for My Valentine
Halestorm
All That Remains
Pop Evil

Pabst Blue Ribbon stage:
A Day to Remember
Asking Alexandria
Black Veil Brides
Motionless in White
Otherwise 
Young Guns

Jägermeister stage:
Clutch
The Sword
Red Line Chemistry
Heaven's Basement
Gemini Syndrome
Scorpion Child

Old Milwaukee comedy stage:
Ari Shafir
Jim Florentine
Big Jay Oakerson
Bill Arrundale
Bill Squire

Day three (Sunday, May 19)

Monster Energy main stage:
Soundgarden
Alice in Chains
Bush
Volbeat
Skillet
Steel Panther
Sevendust
Sick Puppies

Pabst Blue Ribbon stage:
Lamb of God
Device 
In This Moment
Ghost B.C.
Red
Big Wreck

Jägermeister stage:
Deuce
Middle Class Rut
Thousand Foot Krutch
Beware of Darkness
O'Brother
 Error 504

Old Milwaukee comedy stage:
Jim Florentine
Big Jay Oakerson
Rod Paulette
Dan Swartwout
Bob Cook

2014 lineup

Day one (Friday, May 16)

Monster Energy main stage:
Guns N' Roses
Staind
Seether
Black Label Society
Killswitch Engage
Black Stone Cherry
Redlight King

Ernie Ball stage:
Down
Living Colour
Reignwolf
We Came as Romans
Thousand Foot Krutch
Kyng
Devour the Day

Jägermeister stage:
Lacuna Coil
Butcher Babies
One Ok Rock
Truckfighters
Werm
Kill Devil Hill

Old Milwaukee comedy stage:
Jim Florentine
Michael Harrisson
Chuck Zumock
Sumukh Torgalkar
Keith Bender

Day two (Saturday, May 17)

Monster Energy main stage:
Avenged Sevenfold
Slayer
Chevelle
Theory of a Deadman
Pop Evil
Fuel
Rev Theory

Ernie Ball stage:
Suicidal Tendencies
The Pretty Reckless
Nothing More
Texas Hippie Coalition
King 810
We as Human
 Stars in Stereo

Jägermeister stage:
Exodus
Fozzy
Avatar
Crobot
Wilson
INFIDEL

Old Milwaukee comedy stage:
Don Jamieson 
 Joe Howard
Bill Crawford 
Bill Squire
 Brian Kenny

Day three (Sunday, May 18)

Monster Energy main stage:
Kid Rock
Five Finger Death Punch
Alter Bridge
Mastodon
Wolfmother
Adelitas Way
Trivium

Ernie Ball stage:
Jason Bonham's Led Zeppelin Experience
Of Mice & Men
Miss May I
 Harlot
Heaven's Basement
Gemini Syndrome
Righteous Vendetta

Jägermeister stage:
Gojira
Kvelertak
Jim Breuer Band
Twelve Foot Ninja
Monster Truck
Sleepwave

Old Milwaukee comedy stage:
Jim Breuer 
Aaron Kleiber
Chris Coen
Darrell Dawson

2015 lineup

Day one (Friday, May 15)

Monster Energy main stage:
Slipknot
Marilyn Manson
Slash featuring Myles Kennedy and The Conspirators
Breaking Benjamin 
Live
Apocalyptica
We Are Harlot

Ernie Ball stage:
Falling in Reverse
Yelawolf
The Dillinger Escape Plan
Young Guns
Vamps
Islander
Shaman's Harvest

Jägermeister stage:
Hatebreed
Beartooth
 DangerKids
Dorothy
Highly Suspect
 X Factor 1

Rolling Rock comedy tent:
Brian Posehn
Jim Florentine
 Mark Poolos
 Brent Terhune
 Joe Howard

Day two (Saturday, May 16)

Monster Energy main stage:
Judas Priest
Godsmack
Papa Roach
In This Moment
Scott Weiland and The Wildabouts
Of Mice & Men
Saint Asonia

Ernie Ball stage:
Ministry
In Flames
Babymetal
Tremonti
Sabaton
Like a Storm
 Screaming for Silence

Jägermeister stage:
The Devil Wears Prada
Nonpoint
Saxon
From Ashes to New
Red Sun Rising
 Novallo

Rolling Rock comedy tent:
Jim Norton
 Don Jamieson
 Bill Squire
 Jay Snyder
 Bill Arrundale

Day three (Sunday, May 17)

Monster Energy main stage:
Linkin Park
Rise Against
Volbeat
Halestorm
Anthrax
The Pretty Reckless
Hollywood Undead

Ernie Ball stage:
Tech N9ne
Motionless in White 
Rival Sons
Otherwise
Starset
Art of Dying
Unlocking the Truth

Jägermeister stage:
Periphery
Upon a Burning Body
Crobot
Marmozets
September Mourning
Santa Cruz

Rolling Rock comedy tent:
Rob Schneider
 Rod Paulette
 Jake Innarino
 Craig Peters
 Chad Zumrock

2016 lineup

Day one (Friday, May 20)

Monster Energy Main Stage:
Disturbed
Shinedown
A Day to Remember
Sixx:A.M. 
Bullet for My Valentine
Sevendust
Sick Puppies

Stage Two:
Megadeth
Machine Gun Kelly
Asking Alexandria
Trivium
Enter Shikari
Avatar
Monster Truck

Stage Three:
Butcher Babies
Memphis May Fire
Miss May I
Andrew Watt
We Came as Romans
Cane Hill

Rolling Rock Comedy Tent:
Jay Mohr
Bethany Dwyer
Gary Menke
Jay Snyder
Adrian Crosby

Day two (Saturday, May 21)

Monster Energy Main Stage:
Rob Zombie
Five Finger Death Punch
Hellyeah
Steel Panther
Pop Evil
Saint Asonia
P.O.D.

Stage Two:
Lamb of God
Ghost
Parkway Drive
Issues
Texas Hippie Coalition
Aranda
Lacey Sturm

Stage Three:
Clutch
Crown the Empire
New Years Day
Wilson
JellyRoll
Citizen Zero

Rolling Rock Comedy Tent:
That Metal Show live
Craig Gass
Madison Malloy

Day three (Sunday, May 22)

Monster Energy Main Stage:
Red Hot Chili Peppers
Deftones
Bring Me the Horizon
Wolfmother
Death from Above 1979
The Struts
Highly Suspect

Stage Two:
At the Drive-In
Pennywise 
Anti-Flag
Red Sun Rising
Hands Like Houses
The Glorious Sons
 The Shelters

Stage Three:
Between the Buried and Me
The Sword
The Shrine
Wild Throne
Code Orange
Silver Snake

Rolling Rock Comedy Tent:
Jay Oakerson
Nate Bargatze
Bill Squire
Jay Armstrong
Chad Zumock

2017 lineup

Day one (Friday, May 19)

Monster Energy main stage:
Soundgarden (did not play due to the death of Chris Cornell)
Live
Chevelle
Bush
Of Mice & Men
Thrice
Beartooth

Stage two:
Pierce the Veil
Sum 41
Motionless in White
The Amity Affliction
I Prevail
Badflower
Goodbye June

Stage three:
Gojira
Norma Jean
Red Fang
Bleeker
Cover Your Tracks
Aeges

Day two (Saturday, May 20)

Monster Energy main stage:
Korn
The Offspring
Papa Roach
Seether
Alter Bridge
Skillet
Starset

Stage two:
Coheed and Cambria
Taking Back Sunday
The Story So Far
Kyng
Ded
Sylar
Fire from the Gods

Stage three:
In Flames
Whitechapel
Attila
Turnstile
Frank Carter & The Rattlesnakes
One Less Reason

Day three (Sunday, May 21)

Monster Energy main stage:
Metallica
Volbeat
Primus
The Pretty Reckless
Biffy Clyro
Nothing More
Rival Sons

Stage two:
Amon Amarth
The Dillinger Escape Plan 
Zakk Sabbath
Dinosaur Pile-Up
Radkey
Dorothy
 As Lions

Stage three:
Deafheaven
Suicide Silence
Every Time I Die
Wage War
Royal Republic
Mother Feather

2018 lineup

Day one (Friday, May 18)

Monster Energy Main Stage:
Alice in Chains
A Perfect Circle
Breaking Benjamin
Machine Gun Kelly
Greta Van Fleet
10 Years
The Bronx

Zippo Encore Stage:
Underoath
Quicksand
Hawthorne Heights
Turnstile
Senses Fail
The Fever 333
I See Stars

Bud Light Stage:
Body Count
Atreyu
Power Trip
Dance Gavin Dance
Mutoid Man
Spirit Animal

Rolling Rock Comedy Tent:
Trae Crowder
Tim Dillon
Jake Iannarino
Tom Dustin
Jay Armstrong

Day two (Saturday, May 19)

Monster Energy Main Stage:
Avenged Sevenfold
Stone Sour
Three Days Grace
Black Veil Brides
Asking Alexandria
New Years Day

Zippo Encore Stage:
Tech N9ne
Trivium
From Ashes to New
JellyRoll
My Ticket Home
Like Moths to Flames

Bud Light Stage:
Andrew W.K.
Emmure
Miss May I
Wilson
grandson

Rolling Rock Comedy Tent:
J.B. Smoove
Yannis Pappas
Jason Banks
Bill Squire
Chad Zumock

Day three (Sunday, May 20)

Monster Energy Main Stage:
Tool
Godsmack
Stone Temple Pilots
The Used
I Prevail
Red Sun Rising
Tyler Bryant & the Shakedown
Them Evils

Zippo Encore Stage:
Babymetal
Baroness
Code Orange
Like a Storm
Shaman's Harvest
Shim
Stitched Up Heart

Bud Light Stage:
Yelawolf
Anti-Flag
We Came as Romans
Toothgrinder
Joyous Wolf
Pray For Sleep

Rolling Rock Comedy Tent:
Big Jay Oakerson
Taylor Tomlinson
Zach Martina
Aaron Kleiber

Winnipeg
On February 13, 2009, Rock on the Range announced that the festival would travel to Winnipeg, Manitoba in Canada to play at Canad Inns Stadium. The show was on Saturday, June 27, 2009. The weather throughout the day was rain and clouds, earning this year's festival the nickname "Rock in the Rain".

Rock on the Range Canada 2010 on August 7, 2010, had sunny skies with over 15,000 fans in attendance. On March 19, 2010, it was announced Rock on the Range Canada has signed a new multi-year agreement with Manitoba Telecom Services to become the new title sponsor until 2012. The new name under the agreement is "MTS Rock on the Range Canada". On July 18, 2011, Rock on the Range Canada was going to be moved to the MTS Centre due to the weather.

March 2, 2012, Winnipeg radio station Power 97 posted on their Twitter that MTS Rock on the Range Canada would not be happening in 2012.

2009 lineup

Saturday, June 27

Main stage
Billy Talent
Rise Against
Rancid
Theory of a Deadman
Shinedown
Thornley
Blue October
Die Mannequin

Second stage
Anvil
Silverstein
Inward Eye
Hollywood Undead
Pop Evil
Age of Daze
Sick of Sarah

2010 lineup

Saturday, August 7

Monster Energy stage
Stone Temple Pilots
Godsmack
Three Days Grace
Buckcherry
Finger Eleven
Crash Karma
Danko Jones

Jägermeister stage
The Trews
Airbourne
Bleeker Ridge
Domenica
MENEW
Sons of York

2011 lineup

Saturday August 20

Monster Energy stage
Alice in Chains
Evanescence
Five Finger Death Punch
Hinder
Duff McKagan's Loaded
Art of Dying
Me Versus:

Jägermeister stage
The Sheepdogs
Volbeat
Anberlin
The Reason
Drive A

References

External links
 Rock on the Range
 Rock on the Range (Canada)

Heavy metal festivals in the United States
Music festivals established in 2007
Rock festivals in the United States